Bukharov is a Russian surname. Notable people with the surname include:

 Aleksandr Bukharov (born 1985), Russian footballer
 Aleksandr Bukharov (footballer, born 1987), Russian footballer
 , Russian actor

Russian-language surnames